NEFA is a moderate affinity NMDA antagonist (IC50 = 0.51 μM). It is a structural analog of phencyclidine. It was first synthesized by a team at Parke-Davis in the late 1950s.

References 

Dissociative drugs
NMDA receptor antagonists
Fluorenes
Amines